Saverio Gandini (1729 – 9 March 1796) was an Italian painter of the late-Baroque and Neoclassic periods, mainly active in Brescia.

Born in Cremona, he became a pupil of Ferdinando Galli-Bibiena. As a young man, he traveled to Rome to paint and study for a few years, then returned to Brescia.

References

1729 births
1796 deaths
Painters from Cremona
18th-century Italian painters
Italian male painters
Painters from Brescia
18th-century Italian male artists